The Disarming Act (1 George 1 session 2 C.26) was an 18th-century Act of Parliament of Great Britain that was enacted to curtail Jacobitism among the Scottish clans in the Scottish Highlands after the Jacobite rising of 1715. The new law, which came into effect on 1 November 1716, aimed at "securing the peace of the highlands in Scotland". It outlawed anyone in defined parts of Scotland from having "in his or their custody, use, or bear, broad sword, poignard, whinger, or durk, side pistol, gun, or other warlike weapon" unless authorised.

However, the act proved ineffectual at enforcing the ban. In 1725 a new act was passed that for "disarming the highlands in that part of Great Britain called Scotland; and for the better securing the peace and quiet of that part of the kingdom". This new law was enforced by Major-General George Wade, who used it to successfully confiscate a significant number of weapons. Wade's efforts to confiscate weapons of war from was proven by the number of antiquated weapons brandished by the Highlanders who answered the call when Bonnie Prince Charlie began the Jacobite rising at Glenfinnan in 1745. Nevertheless, the Jacobite forces quickly acquired many of the latest British Army-issued government Land Pattern Muskets and bayonets after their resounding victory at Prestonpans.

The main articles of the Disarming Act were further strengthened in the Act of Proscription 1746 following the defeat of Bonnie Prince Charlie at the Battle of Culloden in 1746.

References

External links
Act of Proscription 1747
Act against the Highland Dress
Acts against the Highland Dress

Military disbanding and disarmament
Great Britain Acts of Parliament 1716
Great Britain Acts of Parliament 1725
Legal history of Scotland
Acts of the Parliament of Great Britain concerning Scotland
18th century in Scotland
1716 in Scotland
1725 in Scotland
Gun politics in the United Kingdom
Firearm laws